Dehui is a county-level city of Jilin Province, Northeast China, it is under the administration of the prefecture-level city of Changchun, located in the middle of the Songliao Plain. It has a total population of 906,000 and a rural population of 753,000. It borders Yushu to the northeast, Jiutai to the south, Kuancheng District to the southwest, Nong'an County to the west, as well as the prefecture-level cities of Jilin to the southeast and Songyuan to the northwest.

Administrative divisions
Subdistricts:
Shengli Subdistrict, Jianshe Subdistrict, Huifa Subdistrict, Xiajiadian Subdistrict

Towns:
Daqingzui, Guojia, Songhuajiang, Dajiagou, Dafangshen, Chalukou, Zhuchengzi, Buhai, Tiantai, Caiyuanzi

Townships:
Tongtai Township, Biangang Township, Wutai Township, Chaoyang Township

Climate

References

External links
  Dehui City

Cities in Jilin
Changchun
County-level divisions of Jilin